Brent Michael Jones (born February 12, 1963) is an American former professional football player, business executive, businessman, coach, and sports analyst. As a player, he was a tight end for the San Francisco 49ers during his entire 11-year career in the National Football League (NFL) from 1987 to 1997. Jones is listed among the top players in franchise history, and helped revolutionize the concept of the pass-catching tight end.

After playing college football at Santa Clara University, Jones was selected 135th overall by the Pittsburgh Steelers in the fifth round of the 1986 NFL Draft. Cut after one season with the Steelers, he joined the 49ers during training camp in 1987. He went on to become the team's starting tight end in his third season after the retirement of John Frank and played with the 49ers for 11 seasons. He finished his 49ers career as the franchise's all-time leader in receptions (417), receiving yards (5,195) and receiving touchdowns (33) by a tight end, until Vernon Davis surpassed all three of those records. In the regular season, Jones played in 143 career games, winning 110 of them. In the playoffs, Jones played in 21 career games, starting 19 games, and winning 14 of them. Jones won nine NFC West titles with the 49ers. Jones finished his playoff career with 60 receptions for 740 receiving yards. Jones won three Super Bowls and was named All-Pro three times (1992–1994) and was selected to four Pro Bowls (1992–1995). These are all franchise records by a tight end. Jones never experienced a losing season and has one of the highest winning percentages in NFL history.

Early life
Brent Michael Jones was born on Tuesday, February 12, 1963, to Barbara and Mike Jones in San Jose, California. His father Mike is a former quarterback drafted by the Oakland Raiders in the 1960 NFL Draft. Mike Jones played college football at San Jose State University for the Spartans and is a former high school football coach and teacher. Before going to bed, Jones would play a game with his father and his brother called 100 catches where they would each have to catch 100 straight passes. If they dropped one they would have to start all over. Jones attended Leland High School in San Jose, California, where he played football and baseball. In high school, he was a wide receiver in football and was a catcher in baseball. Due to a back injury, he did not play football his junior year and was a third-string football player his senior year. Despite his limited play, Leland's head football coach said at his team banquet, that he felt Jones had the most potential to play in the Pacific-10 Conference. In baseball, he was a First-team All-BVAL selection and his dream was to play Major League Baseball.

College career
Jones did not find out he was going to attend Santa Clara University until he came back from his senior class trip to Hawaii. A standout high school baseball player, he was initially recruited to SCU with a baseball scholarship, but also played wide receiver on the football team. Due to injury, he was cut from the baseball team his second year and his focus and athletic scholarship was shifted to football.

Jones served as both a key blocker and primary receiving target in four years with Santa Clara. During his sophomore season, Jones made the shift from wide receiver to tight end. By the conclusion of his collegiate career, he had led the Broncos to two Western Football Conference championships. A three-time all-conference selection, Jones ranks second all-time in school history with 137 career receptions, fourth with 2,267 receiving yards, fourth in scoring with 200 points and third with 24 touchdown receptions.

Statistics

Professional career

1986 NFL Draft

Jones flew to New Orleans, Louisiana to participate in the NFL Combine. The Pittsburgh Steelers selected Jones with the 135th overall pick in the fifth round of the 1986 NFL Draft.

Pittsburgh Steelers

1986
On Sunday, May 11, while driving home on Mother's Day, Jones and his girlfriend Dana were both injured in a car accident after being hit by a drunk driver. The driver drove down the wrong side of the road in a massive head-on collision. Jones suffered a herniated disc in his neck and Dana broke her jaw on the steering wheel and dislocated her shoulder. The Steelers kept him on the roster until about a month into the regular season. The team would finish the 1986 NFL season 6–10 and third in the AFC Central under Hall of Fame head coach Chuck Noll, failing to qualify for the 1986–87 NFL playoffs. Due to his later success, Jones is considered the worst cut by the Pittsburgh Steelers.

San Francisco 49ers

1987
Jones joined his hometown team, the San Francisco 49ers, as a rookie backup during training camp. On Sunday, December 6, at Lambeau Field, in a 23–12 win over the Green Bay Packers, Jones made his NFL regular season debut, won his first career NFL regular season game, and recorded his first career reception on a 13-yard pass from quarterback Joe Montana. The team finished the strike-shortened 1987 NFL season 13–2 and first in the NFC West under Hall of Fame head coach Bill Walsh. Jones appeared in the last four games, finishing with two receptions for 35 receiving yards in Walsh's West Coast offense. On Saturday, January 9, 1988, at Candlestick Park, Jones made his NFL playoff debut in the 1987–88 NFL playoffs against the Minnesota Vikings and recorded his first career reception on a seven-yard pass from quarterback Joe Montana.

1988
On Sunday, November 6, at Sun Devil Stadium, Jones caught his first career receiving touchdown against the Phoenix Cardinals. It was a three-yard pass from quarterback Steve Young that put the Niners up 23–0 in the third quarter. The team finished the 1988 NFL season 10–6 and first in the NFC West. Jones appeared in 11 games, finishing with eight receptions for 57 receiving yards and two receiving touchdowns. On Sunday, New Year's Day, January 1, 1989, at Candlestick Park, in a 34–9 win over the Minnesota Vikings, Jones won his first career playoff game. On Sunday, January 22, at Joe Robbie Stadium, in a 20–16 win over the AFC Champion Cincinnati Bengals in Super Bowl XXIII, the 49ers won their third Super Bowl in franchise history, giving Jones his first. For the 1988–89 NFL playoffs, Jones made two starts and appeared in three games, finishing with two receptions for 17 receiving yards.

1989
Jones emerged as a starter in the 1989 season, following the retirement of John Frank. The team finished the 1989 NFL season 14–2 and first in the NFC West under new head coach George Seifert. Jones started all 16 games, finishing with 40 receptions for 500 receiving yards and four receiving touchdowns. On Saturday, January 6, 1990, at Candlestick Park, in a 41–13 win over the Minnesota Vikings, Jones recorded his first career playoff receiving touchdown on an eight-yard pass from quarterback Joe Montana that put the Niners up 14–3 in the second quarter. On Sunday, January 28, at the Louisiana Superdome, in a 55–10 win over the AFC Champion Denver Broncos in Super Bowl XXIV, Jones and the 49ers won their second consecutive and fourth Super Bowl. Jones chipped in with his first Super Bowl reception and receiving touchdown on the same play; a seven-yard pass from quarterback Joe Montana to put the Niners up 13–3 in the first quarter. For the 1989–90 NFL playoffs, Jones made three starts, finishing with eight receptions for 77 receiving yards and a career-high three receiving touchdowns.

1990
On Sunday, September 23, at Candlestick Park, in a 19–13 win over the Atlanta Falcons, Jones recorded a career-high 125 receiving yards from quarterback Joe Montana in a single game. The team finished the 1990 NFL season 14–2 and first in the NFC West. Jones again started all 16 games, finishing with 56 receptions for a career-high 747 receiving yards and five receiving touchdowns. On Saturday, January 12, 1991, at Candlestick Park, in a 28–10 win over the Washington Redskins, Jones caught a career-long 47-yard pass from quarterback Joe Montana. It was the longest reception for yards in Jones’ career in the playoffs. For the 1990–91 NFL playoffs, Jones made two starts, finishing with seven receptions for a career-high 149 receiving yards.

1991
The team finished the 1991 NFL season 10–6. Jones made nine starts and appeared in ten games, finishing with 27 receptions for 417 receiving yards.

1992
The team finished the 1992 NFL season 14–2 and first in the NFC West. Jones started 15 games, finishing with 45 receptions for 628 receiving yards and four receiving touchdowns. He was selected to play in his first career Pro Bowl. For the 1992–93 NFL playoffs, Jones made two starts, finishing with seven receptions for 104 receiving yards and one receiving touchdown.

1993
On Sunday, October 3, at Candlestick Park, in a 38–19 win over the Minnesota Vikings, Jones caught a career-high eight receptions from quarterback Steve Young. The team finished the 1993 NFL season 10–6 and first in the NFC West. Jones started all 16 games for the third time in his career, finishing with a career-high 68 receptions for 735 yards and three touchdowns, and played in his second consecutive Pro Bowl. For the 1993–94 NFL playoffs, Jones made two starts, finishing with seven receptions for 65 receiving yards.

1994
On Sunday, November 6, at Robert F. Kennedy Memorial Stadium, in a 37–22 win over the Washington Redskins, Jones caught a career-long 69-yard pass from quarterback Steve Young to put the Niners up 10–0 in the first quarter. It was the longest reception for yards and longest receiving touchdown in Jones’ career in the regular season. The team finished the 1994 NFL season 13–3 and first in the NFC West. Jones started 15 games, finishing with 49 receptions for 670 receiving yards and a career-high nine receiving touchdowns. He was selected to play in his third consecutive Pro Bowl. On Sunday, January 29, 1995, at Joe Robbie Stadium, in a 49–26 win over the AFC Champion San Diego Chargers in Super Bowl XXIX, Jones won his third Super Bowl as a player, giving the 49ers their fifth in the last 14 seasons. He became the second tight end after Marv Fleming to win at least three Super Bowl championships and the first tight end in NFL history to win three titles without losing one. Jay Novacek would accomplish the feat the following year by winning his third without losing one and shortly after by Shannon Sharpe as well. Rob Gronkowski has since become the fifth tight end to win at least three Super Bowls. For the 1994–95 NFL playoffs, Jones made three starts, finishing with a career-high ten receptions for 104 receiving yards and one receiving touchdown.

1995
The team finished the 1995 NFL season 11–5 and first in the NFC West. Jones started all 16 games, finishing with 60 receptions for 595 receiving yards and three receiving touchdowns. He was selected to play in his fourth consecutive Pro Bowl. On Saturday, January 6, 1996, at 3Com Park, Jones made the start against the Green Bay Packers and recorded playoff career-highs in a single game for the 1995–96 NFL playoffs with eight receptions and 112 receiving yards.

1996
The team finished the 1996 NFL season 12–4. Jones made 10 starts and appeared in 11 games, finishing with 33 receptions for 428 receiving yards and one receiving touchdown. For the 1996–97 NFL playoffs, Jones made two starts, finishing with six receptions for 54 receiving yards.

1997
The team finished the 1997 NFL season 13–3 and first in the NFC West under new head coach Steve Mariucci. Jones made 12 starts and appeared in 13 games, finishing with 29 receptions for 383 receiving yards and two receiving touchdowns. On Monday, January 12, 1998, Jones appeared on the cover of Sports Illustrated. For the 1997–98 NFL playoffs, Jones made one start and appeared in two games, finishing with four receptions for 51 receiving yards.

NFL career statistics

Regular season

Playoffs

NFL records
By a tight end:
 1.000 NFL Championship / Super Bowl winning percentage (minimum 3 Super Bowls – tied with Jay Novacek and Shannon Sharpe)
 1.000 NFL Championship / Super Bowl winning percentage with one team (minimum 3 Super Bowls – tied with Jay Novacek)
 14 career playoff wins with one team
 21 career playoff games played
 21 career playoff games played with one team
 First player to go 3–0 in Super Bowl career
 First player to go 3–0 in Super Bowl career with one team
 First player to start Super Bowl career 3–0
 First player to start Super Bowl career 3–0 with one team
 One of two players to win at least three NFL Championships / Super Bowls with one team without losing one (Jay Novacek)
 One of three players to win at least three NFL Championships / Super Bowls with one team (Jay Novacek and Rob Gronkowski)
 One of three players to win at least three NFL Championships / Super Bowls without losing one (Jay Novacek and Shannon Sharpe)
 One of five players to win at least three NFL Championships / Super Bowls (Marv Fleming, Jay Novacek, Shannon Sharpe, and Rob Gronkowski)
 First and only player to win at least 14 career playoff games with one team
 One of three players to win at least 14 career playoff games (Rob Gronkowski and Marv Fleming)

San Francisco 49ers franchise records
By a tight end:
 Three NFL / Super Bowl championships
 Three NFL / Super Bowl appearances
 110 career regular season wins
 14 career playoff wins
 0.769 regular season winning percentage
 0.666 playoffs winning percentage
 143 career regular season games played
 19 career playoff games started
 60 career playoff receptions
 740 career playoff receiving yards
 Three-Time All-Pro
 Four-Time Pro Bowler

Career highlights

Honors
Jones was inducted into the Division II Football Hall of Fame in 2001, the College Football Hall of Fame in 2002, and the Bay Area Sports Hall of Fame in 2013.

Awards

Off the field

Personal life
Brent and Dana Jones met while attending Santa Clara University and were married in 1987. They have two daughters, Rachel and Courtney, who are both former NCAA Division I student athletes and played soccer. Rachel played for the Cal Poly Mustangs and Courtney played at the University of North Carolina at Chapel Hill, helping the Tar Heels win two consecutive NCAA Championships in her freshman and second years in 2008 and 2009. Courtney was drafted sixth overall by the Boston Breakers in the 2013 NWSL Supplemental Draft. She played professional soccer as a forward and defender for the new Breakers and FC Kansas City in the NWSL.

Broadcasting career
Shortly after his playing career ended, Jones became an analyst for The NFL Today. Jones worked for the NFL on CBS from 1998 to 2005. Jones decided to leave CBS Sports during the 2005 NFL season to focus on his business in California, Northgate Capital, which he founded with former teammates Mark Harris and Tommy Vardell.

Business ventures
In 2000, upon retiring from football, Jones and former teammates Steve Young, Tommy Vardell, and Mark Harris co-founded Northgate Capital, a venture capital and private equity investment firm with approximately $4.9 billion of assets under management and offices in San Francisco, Danville, Mexico City, and London and served as its managing director and founding partner. He sold a majority stake in Northgate to Indian financial services company Religare Enterprises in 2010 and continued to manage the firm as a partner. In 2016, after Religare and Northgate's management team sold the firm to The Capital Partnership, an investment advisor with offices in London and Dubai, he became an advisor. Jones is a former member of the board of directors for San Jose Sports & Entertainment Enterprises, which owns the San Jose Sharks of the National Hockey League.

Christianity
Jones is a Christian and found his faith when he attended Young Life as a sophomore in high school. His Young Life leader Tom Raley was instrumental in his life and told him that he would have a career in sports. Jones was one of the first players to start prayer circles in the NFL.

Coaching career
Jones's coaching career began in 2007 at Monte Vista High School, who compete in the East Bay Athletic League. Coaching the tight ends, he mentored Zach Ertz.

Politics
Jones is a Republican. In the past he has been rumored to be a potential political candidate. At one time, he was considered by many pundits to be a potential candidate for the US Congressional seat held by freshman Rep. Jerry McNerney in northern California's 11th congressional district. On March 19, 2009, the San Francisco Chronicle reported that Jones was being recruited to run in a special election to replace U.S. Representative Ellen Tauscher, who was appointed to a position in the State Department, in California's 10th congressional district. On March 4, 2010, David Harmer, a Republican candidate running for California's 11th congressional district, announced that Jones had endorsed Harmer's campaign.

See also

 List of College Football Hall of Fame inductees (players, A–K)

References

External links
 

1963 births
Living people
American football tight ends
Pittsburgh Steelers players
San Francisco 49ers players
Santa Clara Broncos football players
National Football League announcers
National Hockey League executives
College Football Hall of Fame inductees
National Conference Pro Bowl players
California Republicans
Leland High School (San Jose, California) alumni
Sportspeople from Santa Clara, California
Players of American football from San Jose, California